The 2022 NBA draft (branded as the 2022 NBA Draft presented by State Farm for sponsorship reasons), the 76th edition of the National Basketball Association's annual draft, was held on June 23, 2022, at Barclays Center in Brooklyn, New York. The 2022 edition marked a return to the draft's normal June date after postponements were made in 2020 and 2021 due to the COVID-19 pandemic.  The draft consisted of 58 picks instead of the typical 60 due to the loss of a second-round pick for both the Milwaukee Bucks and the Miami Heat for violating the NBA's tampering rules during free agency. The first pick was made by the Orlando Magic, who selected Paolo Banchero from Duke.

Draft picks

Notable undrafted players

These players were not selected in the 2022 NBA draft, but have played at least one regular-season or playoff game in the NBA.

Trades involving draft picks

Pre-draft trades
Prior to the draft, the following trades were made and resulted in exchanges of draft picks between teams.

Draft-night trades
Draft-night trades are made after the draft begins. These trades are usually not confirmed until the next day or after free agency officially begins.

Combine
The 8th G League Elite Camp took place May 16–17, from which certain participants will be selected to join the main draft combine. Of this year's 44 participants in the Elite Camp, seven players were chosen to continue on to the main draft combine: Jared Rhoden, Tyrese Martin, Kenneth Lofton Jr., Bryson Williams, Darius Days, Jalen Wilson, and Marcus Sasser.

The primary portion of the 2022 NBA Draft Combine was held from May 18–20 in Chicago, Illinois.

Draft lottery
The NBA draft lottery was held on May 17.

Eligibility and entrants

The draft is conducted under the eligibility rules established in the league's 2017 collective bargaining agreement (CBA) with its players' union, with special modifications agreed to by both parties due to disruptions caused by the COVID-19 pandemic. The previous CBA that ended the 2011 lockout instituted no immediate changes to the draft, but it called for a committee of owners and players to discuss further charges.

All drafted players must be at least 19 years old during the calendar year of the draft. In term of dates, players who were eligible for the 2022 NBA draft must have been born on or before December 31, 2003.
This draft could have possibly been the first in which high school players of any nationality would have been eligible for selection after their graduation as the two associations sought at first to lower the minimum age back to 18 and end the need to wait one year after their high school class graduated, also called the "one and done" requirement, as discussed in 2019. If approved, the current CBA might have to be amended and the amendment ratified. However, the ineligibility for the draft shortly after high school remained in place, as reported in 2020, unless there were further discussions about its repeal. 
Since the 2016 draft, the following rules are, as implemented by the NCAA Division I council for that division:
Declaration for the draft no longer results in automatic loss of college eligibility. As long as a player does not sign a contract with a professional team outside the NBA or sign with an agent, he retains college eligibility as long as he makes a timely withdrawal from the draft.
NCAA players now have 10 days after the end of the NBA Draft Combine to withdraw from the draft. Since the combine is normally held in mid-May, the current deadline is about five weeks after the previous mid-April deadline.
NCAA players may participate in the draft combine and are allowed to attend one tryout per year with each NBA team without losing college eligibility.
NCAA players may now enter and withdraw from the draft up to two times without loss of eligibility. Previously, the NCAA treated a second declaration of draft eligibility as a permanent loss of college eligibility.

Early entrants
Players who were not automatically eligible had to declare their eligibility for the draft by notifying the NBA offices in writing no later than at least 60 days before the event. For the 2022 draft, the date fell on April 24. Under the CBA a player may withdraw his name from consideration from the draft at any time before the final declaration deadline, which usually falls 10 days before the draft at 5:00 pm EDT (2100 UTC). Under current NCAA rules, players usually have until 10 days after the draft combine to withdraw from the draft and retain college eligibility. In 2022, however, they must have withdrawn on or before June 1, 22 days prior to this draft.

A player who has hired an agent retains his remaining college eligibility regardless of whether he is drafted after an evaluation from the NBA Undergraduate Advisory Committee. Players who declare for the NBA draft and are not selected have the opportunity to return to their school for at least another year only after terminating all agreements with their agents, who must have been certified.

College underclassmen

 Patrick Baldwin Jr. – F, Milwaukee (freshman)
/ Paolo Banchero – F, Duke (freshman)
 Malaki Branham – G/F, Ohio State (freshman)
 Christian Braun – G, Kansas (junior)
 Kendall Brown – G/F, Baylor (freshman)
 John Butler – F, Florida State (freshman)
 Julian Champagnie – G/F, St. John's (junior)
 Kennedy Chandler – G, Tennessee (freshman)
 Max Christie – G, Michigan State (freshman)
 Kofi Cockburn – C, Illinois (junior)
 Johnny Davis – G/F, Wisconsin (sophomore)
 JD Davison – G, Alabama (freshman)
 Moussa Diabaté – F, Michigan (freshman)
 Jalen Duren – C, Memphis (freshman)
 Tari Eason – F, LSU (sophomore)
 Tyson Etienne – G, Wichita State (junior)
 A. J. Green – G, Northern Iowa (redshirt junior)
 Adrian Griffin Jr. – F, Duke (freshman)
 Jordan Hall – G/F, Saint Joseph's (sophomore)
 Chet Holmgren – C/F, Gonzaga (freshman)
 Caleb Houstan – G/F, Michigan (freshman)
 Jaden Ivey – G, Purdue (sophomore)
 Jaden Jones – G/F, Rutgers (redshirt freshman)
 Johnny Juzang – G, UCLA (junior)
 Trevor Keels – G, Duke (freshman)
 Walker Kessler – C, Auburn (sophomore)
 Christian Koloko – C, Arizona (junior)
 Jake LaRavia – F, Wake Forest (junior)
 Hyunjung Lee – G/F, Davidson (junior)
 Justin Lewis – F, Marquette (sophomore)
 E. J. Liddell – F, Ohio State (junior)
 Kenneth Lofton Jr. – F, Louisiana Tech (sophomore)
 Bennedict Mathurin – G, Arizona (sophomore)
 Bryce McGowens – G, Nebraska (freshman)
/ Josh Minott – F, Memphis (freshman)
 Isaiah Mobley – F, USC (junior)
 Aminu Mohammed – G, Georgetown (freshman)
 Iverson Molinar – G, Mississippi State (junior)
 Wendell Moore Jr. – F, Duke (junior)
 Keegan Murray – F, Iowa (sophomore)
 Shareef O'Neal – F, LSU (junior)
 Scotty Pippen Jr. – G, Vanderbilt (junior)
/ Lester Quiñones – G, Memphis (junior)
 Orlando Robinson – F, Fresno State (junior)
 David Roddy – F, Colorado State (junior)
 Ryan Rollins – G, Toledo (sophomore)
 Dereon Seabron – G, NC State (redshirt sophomore)
 Jaden Shackelford – G, Alabama (junior)
 Shaedon Sharpe – G, Kentucky (freshman)
 Jabari Smith Jr. – F, Auburn (freshman)
/ Jeremy Sochan – F, Baylor (freshman)
 AJ Taylor – F, Grambling State (redshirt junior)
 Dalen Terry – G, Arizona (sophomore)
 Jabari Walker – F, Colorado (sophomore)
 TyTy Washington – G, Kentucky (freshman)
 Peyton Watson – G/F, UCLA (freshman)
 Blake Wesley – G, Notre Dame (freshman)
 Donovan Williams – G/F, UNLV (junior)
 Jalen Williams – G, Santa Clara (junior)
 Jaylin Williams – F, Arkansas (sophomore)
 Mark Williams – C, Duke (sophomore)

College seniors
"Redshirt" refers to players who were redshirt seniors in the 2021–22 season. "Graduate" refers to players who were graduate transfers in 2021–22.

 Jalen Adaway – G, St. Bonaventure (redshirt)
 Ochai Agbaji – G, Kansas
 James Akinjo – G, Baylor
 Teddy Allen – G/F, New Mexico State (redshirt)
 Keve Aluma – F, Virginia Tech (redshirt)
 Eric Ayala – G, Maryland
 Marcus Azor – G, UMass Dartmouth
 David Azore – G, UT Arlington (graduate)
 Evan Battey – F, Colorado (redshirt)
 Justin Bean – F, Utah State (redshirt)
 Jules Bernard – G, UCLA
 Jamal Bieniemy – G, UTEP
 Marcus Bingham Jr. – F, Michigan State
 Buddy Boeheim – G, Syracuse
 Luka Brajkovic – F, Davidson
 Izaiah Brockington – G, Iowa State (redshirt)
 Gabe Brown – F, Michigan State
 Tevin Brown – G, Murray State (redshirt)
 Maurice Calloo – F, Oregon State
 R. J. Cole – G, UConn (graduate)
 Vince Cole – G/F, Coastal Carolina
 George Conditt IV – F, Iowa State
 Darius Days – F, LSU
 Adrian Delph – G, Appalachian State
 Michael Devoe – G, Georgia Tech
 Anthony Duruji – F, Florida (redshirt)
 Kyler Edwards – G, Houston
 Keon Ellis – G, Alabama
 Javon Freeman-Liberty – G, DePaul
 Both Gach – G, Utah
 Bryce Hamilton – G, UNLV
 Ron Harper Jr. – G/F, Rutgers
 DJ Harvey – G/F, Detroit Mercy (graduate)
 Jericole Hellems – F, NC State
 Cedric Henderson Jr. – G/F, Campbell
 Trevor Hudgins – G, Northwest Missouri State (redshirt)
 Bodie Hume – G, Northern Colorado
 Austin Hutcherson – G, Illinois (graduate)
 Drake Jeffries – G, Wyoming (redshirt)
 Andrew Jones – G, Texas
 DeVante' Jones – G, Michigan (graduate)
 Noah Kirkwood – G, Harvard
 Peter Kiss – G, Bryant (graduate)
 Tyrese Martin – G/F, UConn
 David McCormack – F, Kansas
 Trey McGowens – G, Nebraska 
 Justin Minaya – F, Providence (graduate)
 Isaiah Mucius – F, Wake Forest
 Grayson Murphy – G, Belmont (graduate)
 Nick Muszynski – C, Belmont (graduate)
 Andrew Nembhard – G, Gonzaga 
 JD Notae – G, Arkansas (redshirt)
 Ike Obiagu – C, Seton Hall (graduate)
 Edward Oliver-Hampton – F, South Carolina State (graduate)
 Malik Osborne – F, Florida State (graduate)
 Anthony Polite – G/F, Florida State (graduate)
 M. J. Randolph – G, Florida A&M
 A. J. Reeves – G, Providence
 Jared Rhoden – G/F, Seton Hall
 Ronaldo Segu – G, Buffalo
 Jaylen Sims – G, UNC Wilmington
 Amadou Sow – F, UC Santa Barbara
 Seth Stanley – F, Hendrix
 Gabe Stefanini – G, San Francisco
/ Sasha Stefanovic – G, Purdue (redshirt)
 Au'Diese Toney – G, Arkansas
 Ryan Turell – F, Yeshiva
 Dallas Walton – F/C, Wake Forest (graduate)
 Collin Welp – F, UC Irvine (redshirt)
 Aaron Wheeler  – F, St. John's (graduate)
 Khristien White – G, Southwestern Christian
 Jeenathan Williams – G/F, Buffalo
 Trevion Williams – F/C, Purdue
 Vince Williams Jr. – G/F, VCU

International players
International players that declared for this draft and did not previously declare in another prior draft could drop out 10 days before the event, on June 13.

  Ibou Badji – C, Força Lleida (Spain)
  Hugo Besson – G, New Zealand Breakers (Australia)
  Ousmane Dieng – F, New Zealand Breakers (Australia)
  Khalifa Diop – C, Herbalife Gran Canaria (Spain)
  Nikola Jović – F, Mega Mozzart (Serbia)
  Ismaël Kamagate – C, Paris Basketball (France)
 / Karlo Matković – C, Mega Mozzart (Serbia)
  Yannick Nzosa – C, Unicaja (Spain)
  Gabriele Procida – G, Fortitudo Bologna (Italy)
  Žiga Samar – G, Urbas Fuenlabrada (Spain)
  Gui Santos – F, Minas (Brazil)
  Pavel Savkov – F, Saski Baskonia (Spain)
  Kai Sotto – C, Adelaide 36ers (Australia)
  Matteo Spagnolo – G, Vanoli Cremona (Italy)

Automatically eligible entrants
Players who do not meet the criteria for "international" players are automatically eligible if they meet any of the following criteria:
They have no remaining college eligibility.
If they graduated from high school in the U.S., but did not enroll in a U.S. college or university, four years have passed since their high school class graduated.
They have signed a contract with a professional basketball team not in the NBA, anywhere in the world, and have played under the contract.

Players who meet the criteria for "international" players are automatically eligible if they meet any of the following criteria:
They are at least 22 years old during the calendar year of the draft. In term of dates players born on or before December 31, 2000, were automatically eligible for the 2022 draft.
They have signed a contract with a professional basketball team not in the NBA within the United States, and have played under that contract.

See also
 List of first overall NBA draft picks

Notes

References

External links
Official site

Draft
National Basketball Association draft
2020s in Brooklyn
Basketball in New York City
Prospect Heights, Brooklyn
Sports in Brooklyn
NBA draft
NBA draft
Sporting events in New York City
Events in Brooklyn, New York